Deltophora peltosema is a moth of the family Gelechiidae. It is found in India, Sri Lanka and Australia (Western Australia, Queensland and New South Wales). Records from South Africa and South America are based on misidentifications.

This species was first described by Oswald Bertram Lower in 1900 as Xenolechia peltosema.

The length of the forewings is 5-5.5 mm. The forewings are grey-brown to ochreous, with mostly indistinct dark brown markings. The hindwings are plain pale brown, with hairy margins. Adults have been recorded on wing from September to April.

References

Moths described in 1900
Deltophora